Badrul Huda Khan is an author and educator focused on web-based training and educational technology.Badrul Khan recognized the potential of the World Wide Web for education early in 1996, and was invited to keynote the NAU/web98 conference, sponsored by Northern Arizona University. Khan first coined the phrase "Web-based instruction" in his 1997 book Web-Based Instruction. He contributed to the development of US virtual education policies organized by the White House Office of Science and Technology Policy and the Naval Postgraduate School, the National Educational Technology Plan by the US Department of Education and the Review of Joint Professional Military Education organized by the Joint Chiefs of Staff. He is a past president of the International Division of the Association for Educational and Communication Technology (AECT). Khan is a United States Distance Learning Association (USDLA) Hall of Fame Inductee.

Writing
His second book, Web-based Training, was published by Educational Publications in 2001. Other books include Managing E-Learning Strategies and E-Learning Quick Checklist. His 2007 book Flexible Learning in an Information Society includes case studies, design models, strategies, and critical issues encompassing the multiple dimensions of his E-Learning Framework. He also developed E-Learning P3 (People-Process-Product) Model  and E-Learning Evaluation Model 

Khan writes a syndicated column for Educational Technology magazine entitled "Interviews with Badrul Khan", for which he interviews leaders around the world who have implemented e-learning in their regions or institutions.

Professional experience
He was the founding Director of the Educational Technology Leadership graduate cohort program in Alexandria and served as Professor at The George Washington University. He also served as the founding Director and Professor of the Educational Technology (ET) graduate program at the University of Texas Brownsville.  He served as an Instructional Developer and Evaluation Specialist at the School of Medicine at Indiana University, Indianapolis. He is the Founder and President of McWeadon Education (a professional development institution).

Education and childhood
He received a B.A. in Chemistry and a Ph.D. in Instructional Systems Technology from Indiana University, Bloomington, IN, USA.

Badrul Huda Khan was born and grew up in Chittagong, Bangladesh in the 1970s. His father's name is  Lokman Khan Sherwani and mother's name is Shabnom Khanam Sherwani.

Published books
 User Interface Design for Virtual Environments: Challenges and Advances (Premier Reference Source)
 Web-Based Instruction, Educational Technology Publications, 1997, 
 Web-Based Training, Educational Technology Publications, 2000, 
 Managing E-Learning Strategies: Design, Delivery, Implementation and Evaluation, Information Science Publishing, 2005, 
 E-learning Quick Checklist, Information Science Publishing, 2005, 
 Learning on demand: ADL and the future of e-learning. Washington DC: Department of Defense.
 Flexible Learning in an Information Society, IGI Global, 2007, 
 E-learning: progettazione e gestion (Italian)
 استراتيجيات التعلم الالكتروني (Arabic)
 E-러닝 성공전략 (Korean)
 ''عنوان کتاب : مديريت يادگيري الكترونيكي (Persian)

References

External links
 A Look at Web-based Instruction Today: An interview with Badrul Khan, Part 1 for eLearn Magazine, an ACM Publication 
 2002 Interview with Khan for The Technology Source 
 E-Learning: An interview with Badrul Khan Executive Times  http://www.exectimes.com/content/jan12/Education.asp
 Badrul Khan's official website 

Year of birth missing (living people)
Living people
Indiana University alumni
American male non-fiction writers
American columnists
American people of Bangladeshi descent
George Washington University faculty
University of Texas at Brownsville faculty